The Portobello Marine Laboratory is located on the end of a short peninsula close to the township of Portobello, within the limits of the city of Dunedin in New Zealand's South Island. It is run as part of the University of Otago, the main campus of which is 23 kilometres to the southwest in Dunedin's main urban area.

History
The laboratory is New Zealand and Oceania's oldest established marine research facility and was opened on 13 January 1904. It was originally proposed for Dunedin by leading MP and naturalist G. M. Thomson as a fish hatchery. 
Initially planned to be sited at Pūrākaunui, north of Port Chalmers, the current site on the shores of Otago Harbour was deemed more suitable.

The laboratory went through a period of revival in the 1950s, in which Elizabeth Joan Batham was a key player.

The laboratory is highly regarded worldwide for its facilities and research, and is an important asset to the university's Marine Science Department. The facility also includes the New Zealand Marine Studies Centre, which offers education programmes to pre-booked groups.

References

External links
Laboratory website

Otago Peninsula
Buildings and structures of the University of Otago
Research institutes in New Zealand